Peterhouse Boat Club is the rowing club for members of Peterhouse, Cambridge. It was founded on 29 April 1828 as St Peter's College Boat Club, but was renamed in 1873 to its present name. The Club's name was officially changed to Peterhouse Boat Club in Michaelmas Term 1872. Alumni of Peterhouse Boat Club are eligible to join the Cross Keys Boat Club.

History 

Peterhouse Boat Club was founded on 29 April 1828 as St Peter's College Boat Club, and first raced in Cambridge University Bumps on 2 May 1828. The club went Head of the River the following year, before removing itself from the start order. The club's history became more formal in 1836, as the minute books from that year exist. At this point there were both rowing, and non-rowing members and the club had as much a social purpose as competitive. The club first purchased a boat in 1839, having previously hired craft. Peterhouse Boat Club returned to Head in 1842. While an undergraduate at the college, the later Lord Kelvin rowed for the club for one term at the end of his second year.

The club was one of the first Cambridge colleges to hire a professional coach, paying James Parish of Leander Club £10 in 1846. In 1847, Andrew Fairbairn joined the club, and was later to contribute to its finances. The Club's name was officially changed to Peterhouse Boat Club in Michaelmas Term 1872. In 1925, the club had some coaching from Steve Fairbairn. The following year, the club sent a crew to Henley Royal Regatta for the first time, entering the Thames Challenge Cup.

While Peterhouse is the smallest of all of the colleges of Cambridge University which regularly admit both undergraduates and graduates, its crews have often performed well above its weight, including taking the headship of the May Bumps on 28 February 1842 and that of the Lent Bumps in 1956. In the early days of the Lent and May Bumps, the Peterhouse 1st men's VIII were in the lower half of the 2nd, or even in the 3rd division, but from about 1920 rose to lie in the bottom-half of the 1st division or top-half of the 2nd division. Peterhouse performed well in the Lent Bumps from 1950, not being bumped until 1957, and taking the headship in 1956, a year in which they also won the Ladies' Challenge Plate at Henley Royal Regatta. For the next fifty years, the Peterhouse 1st men's VIII have spent most of their time in the top-half of the 2nd division or bottom-half of the 1st division in both events. Since 2000, however, there has been a steady rise in the 1st men's VIII upwards through the 1st division. In the May Bumps of 2019, the crew was placed 7th.

In 1948, the Irish Olympian Danny Taylor was a coach while he lectured at Peterhouse. Distinguished coaches since then have included the double Olympic gold-medallist James Cracknell, who rowed in the Peterhouse May Bumps VIII of 2019. 

A women's crew did not appear until 1986 and has remained in the 2nd division for most of the time since then in both the Lent and May Bumps, although the 1st women's VIII did succeed in breaking into the 1st division in the May Bumps in 2002 for the first time. In 1986, the Peterhouse 1st women's VIII managed the first ever quadruple over-bump in the history of  racing in the May Bumps when they caught Clare III to rise 9 positions in a single day.

During World War II, the college hosted members of the London School of Economics, who rowed in the Boat Club's shells during that time.

Boathouse 

Peterhouse owns its own boathouse. The current building being the second boathouse to be built on the land. The first dated to 1897 and cost £880, including £280 for the land. It was replaced in 1928 with the current structure at a cost of £4000. It was designed by Montague Wheeler, who was also responsible for the design of the boat house for Trinity Hall Boat Club. The boathouse was extended in 1992 with a new shed to accommodate fours and small boats. Space in the boat house is currently leased to Murray Edwards College.

Club Colours and Kit 

The first reference to the club's colour of blue comes in a minute from 21 March 1838, but the colour may have been settled upon earlier.

Peterhouse rows with royal blue blades with two vertical white stripes.

The club has different ties and blazers for its various crews. The tie for the first boat features a royal blue background, with a repeating pattern of three stripes, the middle one thinner than the outer ones. The blazer for first May colours is described as being a "blue blazer edged with 3/4-inch white silk ribbon and mitre and cross keys in silver on pocket". Blazer buttons have had two designs, the earlier one with a design of "St Peter's Boat Club" in a ribbon, around crossed keys, and a second one, used after the club was renamed in 1873 with a design of "Pet. Coll. Cam" below a shield with "BC" and crossed keys.

Famous Members 

A short list of famous members:

R H Cobbold member of the Cambridge Blue Boat in the Boat Race 1841 and the Boat Race 1842
James Mason
Lord Kelvin
Tom Askwith
Danny Taylor (rower), Irish Olympian in the 1948 Summer Olympics
James Cracknell
Matthew Baillie Begbie
Michael Hart
Stefan Forster, German Olympian in the 1996 Summer Olympics
Kevin Whyman, aviator and cox of the Cambridge Blue Boat in the Boat Race 1996
Sebastian Thormann, German Olympian in the 2004 Summer Olympics, member of the Cambridge Blue Boat in the Boat Race 2006
Natan Węgrzycki-Szymczyk, Polish sculler in the 2016 Summer Olympics

Thomas George (rower), bronze medallist for Great Britain in the 2020 Summer Olympics
Oliver Wynne-Griffith, bronze medallist for Great Britain in the 2020 Summer Olympics

Honours

Henley Royal Regatta

Notes

References

External links
Peterhouse Boat Club

Rowing clubs of the University of Cambridge
Boat
Sports clubs established in the 1820s
1827 establishments in England
Rowing clubs in Cambridgeshire
Rowing clubs in England
Rowing clubs of the River Cam